The Flying Dutchman is a 1939 novel by a British author Michael Arlen, published by Heinemann in the UK and by Doubleday Doran in the US. It was his last book.

The novel has been characterised as a psychological study of "an unfrightened man exploring the darkness of the mind."  Kirkus Reviews described it as an urbane and witty fantasy with topical implications.

Plot summary
Chance Winter, whose self-hatred extends to a searing contempt for all humanity, assembles a clandestine group of anarchist killers.

References

1939 British novels
British political novels
Psychological novels
Heinemann (publisher) books